Between Heaven and Earth (German: Zwischen Himmel und Erde) is a 1934 German historical drama film directed by Franz Seitz and starring Rudolf Klein-Rogge, Heinz Klingenberg,  Attila Hörbiger and Karin Hardt. It was shot at the Bavaria Studios in Munich. The film's sets were designed by the art director Max Seefelder. It is based on the 1856 novel of the same title by Otto Ludwig which was subsequently remade as a 1942 film.

Cast
 Rudolf Klein-Rogge as 	Der alte Nettenmaier
 Heinz Klingenberg as Karl, sein Sohn
 Attila Hörbiger as 	Fritz, sein Sohn
 Joe Stöckel as Valentin, Altgeselle
 Karin Hardt as 	Christine
 Thea Aichbichler as 	Witwe Brugger, ihre Großmutter
 Otto Wernicke as 	Motz, Schieferbruchbesitzer
 Wera Liessem as Lily, seine Tochter
 Josef Eichheim as 	Professor Salbermaier
 Hanns Fritz Gerhard as 	Feixner, der Hausherr

References

Bibliography 
 Goble, Alan. The Complete Index to Literary Sources in Film. Walter de Gruyter, 1999.
 Waldman, Harry. Nazi Films In America, 1933-1942. McFarland & Co, 2008.

External links 
 

1934 films
1934 drama films
Films of Nazi Germany
1930s German-language films
Films directed by Franz Seitz
German black-and-white films
Bavaria Film films
Films set in the 19th century
German historical drama films
1930s historical drama films
Films based on German novels
Films shot at Bavaria Studios
1930s German films